Viktoriya Fyodorova (born May 9, 1973) is a retired female high jumper from Russia. She represented Russia at the 1995 World Championships in Athletics, placing eleventh. She also competed at the 1997 IAAF World Indoor Championships (seventh) and the 1998 European Athletics Championships (tenth). 

Fyodorova became involved in track and field in her youth in Leningrad, working under coach Valentina Ivanovna Nikiforova. In age category competitions she was a bronze medallist for the Soviet Union at the 1991 European Athletics Junior Championships, a silver medallist for Russia at the 1994 European Athletics U23 Cup, and a gold medallist at the 1995 Summer Universiade.

At national level she won three Russian titles, topping the podium at the Russian Athletics Championships in 1995 and 1998, as well as a win at the Russian Indoor Athletics Championships in 1997. Her personal best of  came in  		Tartu, Estonia, on 20 June 1997. This ranked her ninth in the world for the 2007 season. She retired after the 2002 season.

International competitions

Seasonal bests

National titles
Russian Athletics Championships
High jump: 1995, 1998
Russian Indoor Athletics Championships
High jump: 1997

See also
List of high jump national champions (women)

References

External links

1973 births
Living people
Athletes from Saint Petersburg
Russian female high jumpers
Soviet female high jumpers
Universiade gold medalists in athletics (track and field)
Universiade gold medalists for Russia
Medalists at the 1995 Summer Universiade
World Athletics Championships athletes for Russia
Russian Athletics Championships winners